This is a list of Nicaraguan Primera División Coaches. Some of these managers were appointed as caretaker managers prior to being given a permanent position.

Current Primera Division coaches

List of Coaches
  Eduardo López (America Managua)
  Martin Mena (America Managua, Diriangén FC, Xilotepelt )
  Mario Alfaro (Managua, Ocotal)
  Vidal Alonso (Ocotal, Chinandega)
  Ramon Otoniel Olivas (Real Estelí )
  Randall Moreno (Ocotal)
  Emilio Palacios  (Xilotepelt)
  Leonidas Rodriguez (Ocotal, ART Jalapa, Real Madriz)
  Rolando Mendez (Diriangén FC)
  Omar Zambrana (Ocotal)
  Douglas Urbina (Juventus Managua)
  Reyna Espinoza Morán (Chinandega)
  Henry Urbina (Walter Ferretti)
  Luis Olivares (Chinandega)
  Emilio Aburto (Managua )
  Alex Cajina (Chinandega)
  Edward Urroz (Juventus, UNAN Managua)
  Luis Vega (Diriangen , UNAN Managua)
  Luis Diaz (Walter Ferretti, Chinandega)
  Florencio Leiva (Walter Ferretti, Diriangén FC)
  Marcos Bodán (San Marcos, Nandasmo)
  Oscar Blanco (Juventus Managua)
  Tyron Acevedo (Real Madriz, ART Jalapa, Diriangen, Managua ) 
  Mario Aburto (Fox Villa)
  Eduardo Alonso (Ocotal)
   Carlos Zambrana (Managua)
  Julio Madrigal (UNAN Managua)
  Flavio Vanegas (Ocotal)
  Óscar Castillo (Sebaco)
  Mauricio Cruz Jiron (Diriangén FC)
  Daniel García (UNAN Managua)
  Jeffrey Perez (San Francisco)
  Carlos Matamoros (Real Madriz)
  Sindulio Adolfo Castellano (Real Madriz, Ocotal)
  Edgardo Sosa (Diriangén FC)
  José Francisco Valladares (Walter Ferretti) 
  Miguel Ángel Palacios (Xilotepelt)
  Francisco Javier Núñez Ramos (Diriangén FC)
  Florentino Colindres Mairena (Ocotal)
  Mario Cruz (Real Madriz)
  Airon Reyes García (Ocotal)
  Elvin Roberto Cerna (Real Madriz)
  Carlos Cardona (Ocotal)
  Hector Medina (Juventus Managua)
  David Aquiles Medina (Real Estelí )
  Rafael Paciencia Núñez (Real Estelí )
  Néstor Holwegger (Xilotepelt )
  Carlos Alberto de Toro (Diriangén FC
  Roberto Chanampe (Diriangen, Ocotal, Juventus Managua)
  Andrés Novara (Diriangén FC )
  Emiliano Barrera (Sebaco, Ocotal )
   Abel Núñez  (Xilotepelt )
  Glen Blanco (Deportivo Masatepe, America Managua, Diriangén FC)
  Marvin Solano (Walter Ferretti
  Luis Fernando Fallas (Managua
  Carlos Walcott (Ocotal
  Angel Orellana (Diriangén FC, xilotepelt, Real Madriz, ART Jalapa)
  Juan Ramón Trejo (Real Madriz, Ocotal)
  Jose Luis Rugamas (Diriangén FC)
  Carlos Aguilar (Walter Ferretti)
  Wilson Gil (Chinandega
  Luís Eduardo Montaño (Real Madriz, UNAN Managua
  Armando Ricardo Hernandez (Real Madriz
  Javier Reales (Ocotal
  Javier Londono (Diriangén FC, Juventus Managua, San francisco
  Mario Reig (Diriangén FC
  José Nelson Lima (Bluefields)
  Daniel Bartolotta (Real Madriz
  Garabet Avedissian (UNAN Managua
  Washington Fernando Araújo (Real Estelí
  Flavio Da Silva (Diriangén FC, Walter Ferretti, Managua
  Amleto Bonaccorso (Managua
  Jack Galindo (Managua
  Javier Martínez Espinoza (Juventus Managua
  Arturo Zavala (Real Madriz

References

External links

Nicaraguan Primera División